Daren Queenan (born October 19, 1966) is an American retired basketball player. Born in Norristown, Pennsylvania, he attended Norristown High School as a teenager but went virtually unrecruited by colleges to play basketball except for nearby Lehigh University in Bethlehem, Pennsylvania. Every coach makes mistakes, but when you say a kid can't play, and he scores 3,000 points, that's a mistake.") McCaffery would become Lehigh's head coach for Queenan's final three seasons.

Basketball career

College
During Queenan's four-year college career, spanning from 1984–85 to 1987–88, he became one of the most prolific scorers in NCAA history. He led Lehigh in scoring all four seasons, finished second in the nation in points per game as a senior (28.4), and is still only one of eight players in Division I to have recorded 2,700+ points and 1,000+ rebounds. He holds numerous school records, including points in a game (49) and career (2,703) as well as total rebounds (1,013). Queenan led the Engineers to the school's first-ever appearance in the NCAA Men's Division I Basketball Championship as a freshman in 1985, then guided them to a second berth in 1988. He was a four-time First Team All-East Coast Conference selection and was the co-honoree of the 1987 ECC Player of the Year award. Especially known for highlight reel dunks, Queenan was also versatile and could play point guard as well.

Professional
Despite his record-setting collegiate career, Queenan was not drafted into the NBA, though he did play for the Detroit Pistons in their training camp. He was later cut because teams were not willing to risk signing a mid-sized player coming from a small, unestablished school (basketball-wise) such as Lehigh. He spent the first couple years after graduating playing in the Continental Basketball Association and even won the CBA Dunk Contest in 1989 as a member of the Charleston Gunners. After two failed NBA tryouts with the Houston Rockets and Detroit Pistons, Queenan realized that overseas was his most viable professional basketball option. Over the course of the next 12 years, he played for teams in the Philippines, Argentina, Belgium, France, Germany and Spain, plus a stint in the United States Basketball League in his later years. He spent the majority of his career in Belgium, where he has become a naturalized citizen and now holds dual citizenship with the United States.

Later life
Queenan is married and has multiple children. He now works as a certified financial planner for TIAA-CREF.

See also
List of NCAA Division I men's basketball players with 2000 points and 1000 rebounds
List of NCAA Division I men's basketball career scoring leaders

References

1966 births
Living people
Alaska Aces (PBA) players
Albany Patroons players
American expatriate basketball people in Argentina
American expatriate basketball people in Belgium
American expatriate basketball people in France
American expatriate basketball people in Germany
American expatriate basketball people in the Philippines
American expatriate basketball people in Spain
American men's basketball players
Apollon Patras B.C. players
Barangay Ginebra San Miguel players
Basketball players from Pennsylvania
Belgian men's basketball players
British Basketball League players
Charleston Gunners players
Gimnasia y Esgrima de Comodoro Rivadavia basketball players
Joventut Badalona players
La Crosse Catbirds players
Lehigh Mountain Hawks men's basketball players
Liga ACB players
Naturalised citizens of Belgium
Okapi Aalstar players
People from Norristown, Pennsylvania
Philippine Basketball Association imports
Rapid City Thrillers players
Shooting guards
Small forwards
Sportspeople from Montgomery County, Pennsylvania